Chester Adgate Congdon (June 12, 1853 – November 21, 1916), was a lawyer and capitalist. Congdon was born in Rochester, New York, on June 12, 1853, his parents being Sylvester Laurentius and Laura Jane Congdon. The Congdon name is indelibly linked with the Glensheen Historic Estate in Duluth, Minnesota.

Early life
On his paternal side he is sixth in descent from James Congdon, a Quaker from England who settled in Rhode Island in the first half of the 17th century. On his paternal side, all ancestors were of English origin. On his mother's side, his ancestry was English and Dutch. All his ancestry had been in North America since the early colonial period. In the public schools of Elmira, and Corning, New York, Chester A. Congdon acquired his preliminary education, which was supplemented by study in the East Genesee Conference Seminary at Ovid, New York. His collegiate work was done at Syracuse University, from which he graduated in 1875 with the degree of Bachelor of Arts. He studied law under the preceptorship of Hiscock, Gifford & Doheny at Syracuse, New York, and in 1877 was admitted to the bar of that state. After admission to the bar in New York state, Mr. Congdon taught school for about a year in Chippewa Falls, Wisconsin, before he went to Saint Paul, Minnesota, in 1879, where he was admitted to the bar of that state and there established himself in the practice of law. On September 29, 1881, at Syracuse, New York, Mr. Congdon was married to Clara Hesperia, a daughter of the Rev. Edward Bannister, a clergyman of San Francisco, California, and to them were born seven children: Walter Bannister Congdon, Edward Chester Congdon, Marjorie, Helen, John, Robert, and Elisabeth Congdon. Chester and Clara would later bring Clara's nephew Alfred Bannister to live with them after being orphaned at six years old.

Business
In 1892 he moved from St. Paul to Duluth, becoming a member of the law firm of Billson & Congdon as the partner of William W. Billson. In 1893 they were joined by judge Daniel A. Dickinson and the firm style of Billson, Congdon & Dickinson was adopted. On the death of the judge in 1902 the surviving partners resumed their original title and thus continued until 1904, when both retired from active practice. In the meantime, Mr. Congdon had extended his efforts to various lines of commercial, industrial, and financial enterprise in his adopted city. He became a prominent figure in connection with the development of the iron and copper mining resources of the Lake Superior country and at the same time his advice and assistance were sought by many business and financial institutions on the directorate of which his name never appeared. He was general counsel of the Oliver Mining Company before its consolidation with other companies, now forming the United States Steel Corporation. He was also the president of the Chemung Iron Company and the Canisteo Mining Company, the vice-president of the American Exchange National Bank of Duluth and a director in the Calumet & Arizona Mining Company of Bisbee, Arizona, the Hedley Gold Mining Company, William Cornell Greene's Greene Cananea Copper Company, the Marshall-Wells Hardware Company, the Gowan-Lenning-Brown Company and various other banking, mining and jobbing enterprises which claimed his attention and profited by his cooperation and direction. He also became interested in agricultural pursuits, making extensive investments in farmlands in the northwest.

Estate

In May 1905, construction of the family home began on the  tract of land along the shore of Lake Superior. It was to be named "Glensheen," with a hefty price tag of $854,000 ($ in  dollars). Construction ended in February 1908—the family had moved in a few months prior. Features of the turn-of-the-century mansion included hot water, electricity, and irrigated grounds from nearby Tischer Creek. Glensheen Historic Estate is now owned by the University of Minnesota-Duluth and is open to the public year-round for tours.

Politics
He held several offices throughout his life, serving from 1881 until 1886 as assistant United States attorney for the district of Minnesota, as a member of the Minnesota House of Representatives from 1909 until 1913, and from 1903 until his death he was a member of the Duluth charter commission. The 1909 Legislature was dominated by the tonnage tax. The legislation would place a tax on all iron ore shipped out of state by companies that did not manufacture steel in Minnesota. Opponents argued that such a tax would inhibit the development of lower grade iron ore properties, something Congdon was heavily invested in. The opposition, led by Chester, would succeed in stopping the legislation. Minnesota would eventually pass a tonnage tax in 1921.

Congdon was re-elected for the 1911 legislature. As a returning legislator, Congdon had more influence and served on eleven committees. He was chair of the Reapportionment (Redistricting) Committee. As the leader in charge of redrawing the state’s legislative districts, he attempted to give northeast Minnesota and the Twin Cities more senators. The boundaries were drawn in such a way to ensure more political power to the steel industry and those against the tonnage tax. His measure would eventually fail.

Chester Congdon also voted:

Against recall elections
Against temperance measures
For limitations on workers going on strike
For free public transport to policemen and firefighters
As well as his pro-brewery group of politicians he was aligned with stopped a vote on ending child labor

He was described as an intelligent and strong legislator who “sacrificed all his fine qualities” to the career politicians and corporate interests.

Minnesota in 1916 made him a member of the Republican National Central Committee and his opinions carried weight in the councils of the party. He was a member of various professional, historical, scientific, social, and fraternal societies and associations. He had membership with the Kitchi Gammi, Northland Country, Commercial and Duluth Boat Clubs, all Duluth, the Minnesota Club of St. Paul; the Minneapolis Club of Minneapolis; the University Club of Chicago; the Duquesne Club of Pittsburgh, Pennsylvania; the Bankers Club of New York; the Commercial Club of North Yakima; and with various college fraternities, including the Upsilon Kappa, Psi Upsilon, Theta Nu Epsilon and Phi Beta Kappa. A contemporary biographer has said of him: "Those who really knew Mr. Congdon found in him a man of tender heart and warm, human sympathies. His philanthropy was general and quite well known, although he sought to keep it under cover and shrank from publicity in this regard. He was a close student of government and state policies, a foe of waste and inefficiency, a friend of political progress as he saw it, a champion of clean public life and sound government. He was always the good citizen, eager to have his part in every forward movement in directions that he judged to be wise."

Family

Wife: Clara Hesperia Bannister 04/29/1854 - 07/12/1950

Children:
Walter Bannister Congdon 11/05/1882 - 10/20/1949
Edward Chester Congdon 05/20/1885 - 11/27/1940
Marjorie Congdon (Dudley) 1/12/1887 - 10/11/1971
Helen Clara Congdon (d'Autremont) 2/16/1889 - 5/19/1966
John Congdon 5/21/1891 - 5/19/1893 
Elisabeth Mannering Congdon 4/22/1894 - 06/27/1977
Robert Congdon 9/4/1898 - 6/12/1975

Notes

References
Glensheen Historic Estate, University of Minnesota, Duluth
History of the Yakima Valley, Washington : comprising Yakima, Kittitas and Benton counties / by W.D. Lyman: S.J. Clarke, 1919
"Will to Murder: The True Story Behind the Crimes & Trials Surrounding the Glensheen Killings" by Gail Feichtinger; 2005.  (1st edition),  (2nd edition)
Lake Superior Lawyer, by Roy O. Hoover

External links 
 Chester A. Congdon in MNopedia, the Minnesota Encyclopedia

1853 births
1916 deaths
Lawyers from Rochester, New York
Businesspeople from Saint Paul, Minnesota
People from Duluth, Minnesota
American people of English descent
Minnesota lawyers
Members of the Minnesota House of Representatives
American manufacturing businesspeople
19th-century American politicians
Businesspeople from Rochester, New York
19th-century American businesspeople
19th-century American lawyers